Our Island Story: A Child's History of England, published abroad as An Island Story: A Child's History of England, is a book by Henrietta Elizabeth Marshall, first published in 1905 in London by T. C. & E. C. Jack.

It covers the history of England from the time of the Roman occupation until Queen Victoria's death, using a mixture of traditional history and mythology to explain the story of British history in a way accessible to younger readers.

Richard Chartres in a lecture delivered at Gresham College mentioned his fondness for this text, relating it to an approach to English history rooted in the works of John Foxe and John Milton.

Prime Minister David Cameron chose Our Island Story when asked to select his favourite childhood book in October 2010:

The book depicts the union of England and Scotland as a desirable and inevitable event, and praises rebels and the collective will of the common people in opposing tyrants, including kings like John and Charles I.

Influence
The book inspired the parody 1066 and All That.

References

External links 

Full text e-book of An Island Story (1920 U.S. edition) (note that the 1953 edition continued to the First World War).
Oxford Dictionary of National Biography: Henrietta Elizabeth Marshall
 

1905 children's books
Children's history books
20th-century history books
History books about England
British children's books